Brian Payne (4 November 1937 – 19 August 2013) was an English footballer active in the 1950s. He made 36 appearances in The Football League for Gillingham.

References

1937 births
English Football League players
Gillingham F.C. players
2013 deaths
English footballers
Association football defenders